The Drama Desk Award for Outstanding Lyrics is an annual award presented by Drama Desk in recognition of achievements in the theatre among Broadway, Off Broadway and Off-Off Broadway productions.

Stephen Sondheim holds the record for most wins and nominations for the award, with ten wins out of twelve nominations.

Winners and nominees

1960s

1970s

1980s

1990s

2000s

2010s

2020s

Multiple wins
 10 wins
 Stephen Sondheim

 2 wins
 Gerard Alessandrini
 Fred Ebb
 David Yazbek

Multiple nominations

 12 nominations
 Stephen Sondheim

 5 nominations
 Jason Robert Brown
 Michael John LaChiusa

 4 nominations
 Fred Ebb
 David Yazbek

 3 nominations
 Lynn Ahrens
 Gerard Alessandrini
 Howard Ashman
 Chad Beguelin
 Rick Crom
 William Finn
 Amanda Green
 Michael Korie
 Lin-Manuel Miranda
 Tim Rice
 Marc Shaiman
 Scott Wittman
 Maury Yeston

 2 nominations
 Susan Birkenhead
 Mel Brooks
 Craig Carnelia
 Michael Friedman
 Jerry Herman
 John Kander
 Jonathan Larson
 David Lindsay-Abaire
 Andrew Lippa
 Robert Lopez
 Dave Malloy
 Richard Maltby, Jr.
 Laurence O'Keefe
 Glenn Slater
 David Zippel

See also
 Tony Award for Best Original Score

References

External links
 Drama Desk official website

Lyrics